Gcina Mazibuko (born 1 March 1983) is a Swaziland international footballer who plays as a striker. As of February 2010, he plays for Royal Leopards in the Swazi Premier League and has won 17 caps and scored one goal for his country.

External links

1983 births
Living people
Swazi footballers
Eswatini international footballers

Association footballers not categorized by position